Kengkou is a station on the Taoyuan Airport MRT located in Luzhu District, Taoyuan City, Taiwan. The station opened for commercial service on 2 March 2017.

Station overview
This elevated station has two island platforms and four tracks, although Express trains do not currently stop at this station. It opened for trial service on 2 February 2017, and for commercial service 2 March 2017.

It will be a future transfer station with the Green line (G32) of Taoyuan Metro.

History
 2017-03-02: The station opened for commercial service with the opening of the Taipei-Huanbei section of the Airport MRT.

Station overview

Around the Station

 Kengkou Painted Village (坑口彩繪村) (about 850 meters north of the station)

Exits
Exit 1: Southwest of Kengguo Rd.

See also
 Taoyuan Metro

References

Railway stations opened in 2017
2017 establishments in Taiwan
Taoyuan Airport MRT stations